Joffre Pachito (born December 31, 1981) is an Ecuadorian footballer recently playing for Sportivo Luqueño of Paraguay's first division.

Club career
Pachito played for many clubs in Ecuador including Emelec, Panamá SC, Peñarol de Manabí, Deportivo Cuenca, Olmedo, and Aucas. For the 2008 season, he had to play in the second division with Aucas. He scored 6 goals in 25 appearances for Aucas.

In December 2008, Sportivo Luqueño's president, Fernando González, announced that they had signed Pachito. He will start playing for them in January 2009.

See also
Football in Ecuador
List of football clubs in Ecuador

References

1981 births
Living people
Association football midfielders
Ecuadorian footballers
C.S. Emelec footballers
C.D. Cuenca footballers
C.D. Olmedo footballers
S.D. Aucas footballers
Sportivo Luqueño players
Ecuadorian expatriate footballers
Expatriate footballers in Paraguay